This is a list of Canadian provinces and territories by homicide rate according to Statistics Canada.



Homicide rate by province 

Note: The rate columns can be sorted in ascending or descending order. Sort the province/territory column to return to alphabetical order.

Rates are calculated per 100,000 inhabitants per year and sorted by population (note that homicide rates fluctuate a lot for areas with low population).

Table 2 

Intentional homicide rate (per 100,000)

See also 

List of countries by intentional homicide rate
List of cities by murder rate
Crime in Canada
List of United States cities by crime rate (2014). Cities with population of 250,000+
List of countries by firearm-related death rate
Homicide in world cities

References

Homicide rate
Canada provinces and territories
Homicide rate
Subdivisions of Canada
Canada, homicide rate